The French brig Carlotta was a brig-rigged corvetta-cannoniera or, corvetta-brig, of 10 guns, launched in 1807 at Venice as Fiamma that served the French Navy as Carlotta.  captured her in 1810 and the British Royal Navy took her into service as HMS Carlotta. She was wrecked in 1812.

Origins
Carlotta followed a design by Andrea Salvini and he probably built her; Napoleon was reportedly at her launch. In 1810 she was at Goro-Primaro, the southernmost branch of the river Po.

Capture
On 11 December 1810 Carlotta was sailing from Venice to Corfu when she encountered Belle Poule. Carlottas captors described her as "La Carlotta Italian brig of war of Ten Guns and One Hundred Men". The Royal Navy took her into service as HMS Carlotta, and Admiral Edward Pellew appointed Lieutenant James Oliver to command her.

Several British vessels shared in the proceeds of her capture.

Fate
On 26 January 1812 a violent gale, together with a strong current, drove Carlotta onto Cape Passaro, wrecking her. Oliver's exertions in saving a cargo of specie and consequent fatigue aggravated a previous wound, costing him the sight in one eye.

Notes, citations and  references
Notes

Citations

References
 

  
 

1807 ships
Brigs of the French Navy
Captured ships
Brigs of the Royal Navy
Maritime incidents in 1812